Table Mountain is a series of flat-topped hills in Tuolumne County, California that roughly parallels the modern Stanislaus River. These hills are capped by lava which flowed down from the crest of the Sierra Nevada 10.4 million years ago and hardened into a rock (latite) that is relatively resistant to erosion. The top of Table Mountain is composed of Table Mountain Latite, which formed from potassium-rich lavas erupted from a center of volcanism near modern-day Sonora Pass around 10.4 million years ago. Most outcrops on Table Mountain reveal flow-top breccias, while some outcrops show distinctive columnar jointing.

Geology
Initially, it was thought that Table Mountain had been formed by a dramatic inversion of the topography. This theory, first proposed in 1862 by William Brewer (a member of the Whitney Survey), suggested that the 10.4-million-year-old lava flow had followed the bottom of a bedrock valley cut by the ancestral Stanislaus River and then hardened, preserving the shape of the river. According to this theory, some time later, the surrounding bedrock landscape eroded away, leaving behind the old river bed as a sinuous flat-topped ridge, thereby 'inverting' the landscape. This theory has been widely cited in scientific articles, textbooks and the popular press, and the geological cross-section illustrating it can be found in a variety of sources. Importantly, J.D. Whitney concluded that the amount of erosion necessary to invert the landscape like this could only have been driven by uplift of the Sierra Nevada.

A later examination of the stratigraphic relationships between the lava flow and older sedimentary deposits contradicted the theory proposed by Brewer. If Brewer's theory were correct, adjacent sediments below the Table Mountain lava would have to be younger than 10.4 million years old. However, adjacent river sediments and volcanic deposits below Table Mountain are tens of millions of years older than the Table Mountain lava. This observation indicates that the ancestral Stanislaus River was not flowing along the bottom of a bedrock valley but, instead, was flowing along the top of a thick sequence of older sedimentary deposits. Therefore, the Table Mountain lava flow appears to have followed the course of a river that was flowing through a volcanic plain. Later, when the eruptions ceased, the Stanislaus River eroded away most of the volcanic rocks that had accumulated over tens of millions of years, leaving behind the more resistant Table Mountain lava and the underlying sediments. Some of the sediments underneath the lava were gold-bearing gravels which were first mined during the California Gold Rush. An important consequence of this new understanding of the formation of the Table Mountain is that it doesn't require uplift of the Sierra Nevada. Whereas uplift would have been an important driver of the significant bedrock erosion needed for Brewer's hypothesis of topographic inversion, eroding the accumulations of volcanic and fluvial deposits is simply explained by a reduction in sediment supply at the close of the volcanic eruptions.

Finally, the geological cross-section that Whitney included in his report to support Brewer's theory was found to be fictional.

Ecology
A variety of flora and fauna are found on Table Mountain. In the spring, many wildflowers can be found atop the mountain including several species of lupine and the yellow mariposa lily, Calochortus luteus. Vernal pools form on the flat top after heavy winter and spring rains, providing habitat for many uncommon plant and animal species. The harsh conditions found on top of Table Mountain generally prevent invasive plants from surviving, resulting in a landscape which is composed primarily of native plants.
White-throated swifts nest on the cliff faces that flank the mountain.

References

See also
Inverted relief

Mountains of Tuolumne County, California
Mountains of the Sierra Nevada (United States)
Mountains of Northern California